The Verdict is a 1959 French drama film directed by Jean Valère. It was entered into the 1st Moscow International Film Festival.

Cast
 Marina Vlady as Catherine Desroches
 Robert Hossein as Georges Lagrange
 Roger Hanin as Antoine Castellani
 Lucien Raimbourg as François Lombard
 Béatrice Bretty as Jeanne Boissard
 Hans Verner as Le commandant SS (uncredited)

References

External links
 

1959 films
1959 drama films
French drama films
1950s French-language films
French black-and-white films
Films directed by Jean Valère
1950s French films